Cristian Alfredo Lucero (born 1 October 1987) is an Argentine professional footballer who plays as a forward for Almopos Aridea.

Career
Lucero played for Independiente Rivadavia's academy after joining at the age of seven. He began his senior league career with Torneo Argentino B side Estudiantes in 2004. Having scored once in thirteen games for the San Luis club, he moved up a step to resign with Independiente Rivadavia. His second season ended with promotion to Primera B Nacional. However, Lucero didn't feature in the second tier as he left to Juventud Unida Universitario, therefore remaining in Torneo Argentino A. Moves to Deportivo Guaymallén and Sportivo Patria followed. By this point, he had also featured for Deportivo Algarroba.

Lucero played for Andes Talleres in the third division in 2012–13, scoring four goals as they experienced relegation. He subsequently spent time with Deportivo Montecaseros and Gutiérrez up until 2016. With Gutiérrez, they were promoted up to Torneo Federal A as he notched twenty goals across fifty-four appearances for the club. Lucero had a short spell with Huracán Las Heras in Torneo Federal B to end 2016, scoring twelve times in twenty-one. On 3 November 2017, Lucero rejoined Independiente Rivadavia; now of Primera B Nacional. His first pro league appearance came in a Flandria draw on 5 November.

In September 2020, Lucero joined Cypriot Second Division club Enosis Neon THOI Lakatamia.

Personal life
Lucero's brother, Adrián, is also a professional footballer.

Career statistics
.

References

External links

1987 births
Living people
Sportspeople from Mendoza, Argentina
Argentine footballers
Argentine expatriate footballers
Association football forwards
Torneo Argentino B players
Torneo Argentino A players
Torneo Federal A players
Primera Nacional players
Club Sportivo Estudiantes players
Independiente Rivadavia footballers
Juventud Unida Universitario players
Deportivo Guaymallén players
Sportivo Patria footballers
Andes Talleres Sport Club players
ENTHOI Lakatamia FC players
Argentine expatriate sportspeople in Cyprus
Expatriate footballers in Cyprus